John Jairo Tréllez Valencia (born 29 April 1968) is a retired Colombian footballer. A striker, he played most of his career with Atlético Nacional of Medellín. He has a son, also a striker, Santiago Tréllez.

Career
Tréllez was born in Turbo, Antioquia, and started playing for Atlético Nacional in 1985. He scored his first goal as professional the same day the debuted against Cúcuta Deportivo. With Atlético Nacional Tréllez scored a total of 116 goals, 14 of which were against Independiente Medellín, Atlético Nacional's eternal rivals. In 1992, he became the top goal scorer in Colombia with 25 goals, becoming the first Colombian to become the league's goal scorer for Atlético Nacional. In 1994, Tréllez became the first Colombian to ever play for Boca Juniors of Argentina, where he scored two goals in 19 games, in all competitions.

At the international level, Tréllez also played two seasons for FC Zürich and then played in the United States for the Dallas Burn.

Honours 
Colombian Championship winner with Atlético Nacional (1991)
Copa Libertadores Championship winner with Atlético Nacional (1989)

Notes

External links
Boca juniors statistics 

1968 births
Living people
Colombian footballers
Colombia under-20 international footballers
Colombia international footballers
Colombian expatriate footballers
Atlético Nacional footballers
Sportspeople from Antioquia Department
Boca Juniors footballers
Esporte Clube Juventude players
Al Hilal SFC players
FC Zürich players
Zhejiang Professional F.C. players
FC Dallas players
Categoría Primera A players
Argentine Primera División players
Major League Soccer players
Expatriate footballers in Argentina
Expatriate footballers in Brazil
Expatriate footballers in China
Expatriate footballers in Switzerland
Expatriate soccer players in the United States
Expatriate footballers in Saudi Arabia
Colombian expatriate sportspeople in Argentina
Colombian expatriate sportspeople in China
1987 Copa América players
1989 Copa América players
Saudi Professional League players
Association football forwards